Einstein: His Life and Universe is a non-fiction book authored by American historian and journalist Walter Isaacson. The biographical analysis of Albert Einstein's life and legacy was published by Simon & Schuster in 2007, and it has received a generally positive critical reception from multiple fronts, praise appearing from an official Amazon.com review as well as in publications such as The Guardian and Physics Today.

In broad terms, the book portrays Einstein as an insolent figure who possessed a strong sense of creativity and independence that, had the physicist succeeded in achieving academic employment as a young man, could have gotten quashed due to the atmosphere of the times.

Background and contents

Issacson had previously written books on the life stories of statesmen Benjamin Franklin and Henry Kissinger. In preparation for the work on Einstein, the author delved into volumes of previously examined writings to and from the physicist. Isaacson additionally collaborated with scientists Murray Gell-Mann, Brian Greene, and Lawrence Krauss to gain knowledge about the underlying background.

Isaacson's biographical analysis of Einstein's life reflects the nature of personal achievement in terms of the importance of inquisitiveness and the willingness to experiment. The physicist's theory of general relativity receives particular emphasis. Broadly speaking, Einstein is viewed as a kind of inherent rebel.

The author describes Einstein's insolent streak and how the sometimes abrasive nature around it cost Einstein much in the short term, though larger society benefited dramatically in the long run. After going through his studies in physics with "a sassy attitude" at the Zurich Polytechnic, Einstein wound up being the only graduate of his year's class not to be offered a job. The author notes Einstein's subsequent trek throughout Europe in search of work and its failure. "I will soon have graced every physicist from the North Sea to the southern tip of Italy with my offer," Einstein is quoted as writing. Rejected by the Swiss army for his misshapen feet and varicose veins, Isaccson details, Einstein finally managed to start a career at the Swiss patent office. Despite the mediocre posting, his independent research into his intellectual passions proved highly influential as Isaacson describes.

Reception
The Observer published a supportive review by journalist Robin McKie. He remarked that Isaacson "triumphed over expectation[s]" as well as wrote that the "thorough exploration of" Einstein's life constituted both "a skillful piece of scientific literature and a thumping good read." McKie labeled Einstein's life story as one of the most interesting tales "in modern science" and lauded Isaacson's "first-rate job in telling it."

The official Amazon.com review of the book, written by Anne Bartholomew, praised the author's approach and details, Bartholomew commenting,

In his review for Physics Today, writer and professor of physics E. L. Schucking broadly praised Isaacson's coverage of Einstein's life story while criticizing a vagueness and flippancy in the portrayal of Einstein's actual scientific ideas. In particular, Shucking criticized the author's "shunning of mathematical formulas" as failing to properly give readers the right context. However, viewing Isaacson's general approach as "thoughtful", Schucking lauded the "sympathetic biography of Einstein" as being well-written "and carefully researched with extensive notes."

Professor Matthew Stanley's review for Historical Studies in the Natural Sciences expressed a mixed response to the book, Stanley contending,

Reviews 
"Walter Isaacson has captured the complete Einstein. With an effortless style that belies a sharp attention to detail and scientific accuracy, Isaacson takes us on a soaring journey through the life, mind, and science of the man who changed our view of the universe." -- Brian Greene, Professor of Physics at Columbia and author of The Fabric of the Cosmos

"This book does an amazing job getting the science right and the man revealed." -- Sylvester James Gates, Professor of Physics at the University of Maryland

"This book will be widely and deservedly admired. It is excellently readable and combines the personal and the scientific aspects of Einstein's life in a graceful way." -- Gerald Holton, Professor of Physics at Harvard and author of Einstein, History, and Other Passions

"Once again Walter Isaacson has produced a most valuable biography of a great man about whom much has already been written. It helps that he has had access to important new material. He met the challenge of dealing with his subject as a human being and describing profound ideas in physics. His biography is a pleasure to read and makes the great physicist come alive." -- Murray Gell-Mann, winner of the 1969 Nobel Prize in Physics and author of The Quark and the Jaguar

"With unmatched narrative skill, Isaacson has managed the extraordinary feat of preserving Einstein's monumental stature while at the same time bringing him to such vivid life that we come to feel as if he could be walking in our midst. This is a terrific work." -- Doris Kearns Goodwin, author of Team of Rivals: The Political Genius of Abraham Lincoln

"Isaacson's treatment of Einstein's scientific work is excellent: accurate, complete, and just the right level of detail for the general reader. Taking advantage of the wealth of recently uncovered historical material, he has produced the most readable biography of Einstein yet." -- A. Douglas Stone, Professor of Physics at Yale

"This is a brilliant intellectual tapestry -- and a great read. Skillfully weaving Einstein's revolutionary scientific achievements, his prolific political initiatives, his complex personal life, and his fascinating personality, Isaacson has transformed the transformer of the twentieth century into a beacon for the twenty-first century." -- Martin J. Sherwin, coauthor of American Prometheus:The Triumph and Tragedy of J. Robert Oppenheimer, winner of the 2006 Pulitzer Prize for biography

"I found so much to admire; there are many places where I just had to cheer what Isaacson had written." -- Dudley Herschbach, Professor of Science at Harvard

"Isaacson has written a crisp, engaging, and refreshing biography, one that beautifully masters the historical literature and offers many new insights into Einstein's work and life." -- Diana Kormos Buchwald, General Editor of the Collected Papers of Albert Einstein

"Isaacson has admirably succeeded in weaving together the complex threads of Einstein's personal and scientific life to paint a superb portrait." -- Arthur I. Miller, author of Einstein, Picasso

“This is a biography that happens to be treatise on creativity. I was about to say scientific creativity, but I think I mean creativity itself. It shows us the creative exuberance of a man with an extraordinary visual imagination, able to recast certain problems in surprising ways.” -- Ian McEwan

See also

2007 in literature

References

External links
Einstein: His Life and Universe - WGBHForum - March 12, 2014
Presentation by Isaacson on Einstein, April 12, 2007, C-SPAN
Presentation by Isaacson on Einstein, November 10, 2007, C-SPAN
 Presentation by Isaacson on Einstein, September 27, 2008, C-SPAN

2007 non-fiction books
Books about Albert Einstein
American history books
English-language books
Popular physics books
Simon & Schuster books